Leibovitch, or Leybovitch, is a surname. Notable people with the surname include:

 Ilan Leibovitch, an Israeli politician who served as a member of the Knesset 
 Keren Leibovitch, an Israeli champion Paralympic swimmer
 Naum Leybovich Prokupets, a  Moldovan-born Soviet sprint canoer
 Richard Leibovitch, a Canadian-American finance expert

See also
 Lebowitz
 Leibovitz
 Leibowitz
 Liebowitz

Similar names
 Leiberman
 Liberman (disambiguation)
 Lieberman
 Liebermann
 Liebmann

Jewish surnames